Zhou Baozhong (1902–1964) was a commander of the 88th Separate Rifle Brigade and Northeast Anti-Japanese United Army resisting the pacification of Manchukuo by the Empire of Japan.
 
After the Chinese Civil War he was made Vice Governor of Yunnan province in 1949.

Early life
He was born on 1902 in Dali Prefecture, Yunnan. His birth name was Xi Liyuan. In 1915, he was admitted to the provincial Dali No. 2 Middle School with excellent results. After the second grade of junior high school, because of the attack of his hometown by warlords and bandits, he dropped out of school and went home to work in farming.

Military career

In February 1917, at the age of 15, he joined the army and participated in the Constitutional Protection Movement. From November 1922 to 1924, he studied military at the Yunnan Military Academy. In 1924, he graduated from Yunnan Jiangwu School.

In 1926, he participated in the Northern Expedition. In March 1927, Zhou served as deputy commander of the 56th Regiment of the Sixth Army of Cheng Qian's National Revolutionary Army. In 1927, he joined the Communist Party of China in Wuhan.

After the fighting between the Kuomintang and Communist Party led to Chinese Civil War, he stayed in the Sixth Army of the National Revolutionary Army to perform secret work in accordance with the instructions of the Yangtze River Bureau of the Central Committee of the Communist Party of China . In December 1927, he served as the deputy commander of the 18th Division of the Sixth Army. During this time, he engaged in troop movement and liaison work in Hunan, Zhejiang, Henan and other provinces. At the end of 1928, Zhou  entered the special class of Communist University of the Toilers of the East in the Soviet Union to study military affairs, where his classmate was future Marshal of China Ye Jianying. Later, he was transferred to the International Lenin School to study politics.

Second Sino-Japanese War

After the September 18th incident in 1931, he returned to China and went to the Northeast, which was then part of the Japanese puppet state of Manchukuo, to serve in the leadership of the Northeast Anti-Japanese United Army. He served as a member of the Manchuria Provincial Committee and Secretary of the Military Commission of the Communist Party of China. During this time, he changed his name to Zhou Baozhong.

As chief of the general staff, he led the army in two battles to conquer Antu County and three battles against the city of Ning'an. In February 1934, he led the formation of the Suining Anti-Japanese Allied Forces, served as the chairman of the military committee, and led his troops to carry out guerrilla activities in Ning'an.

Zhou successively served as the commander of the 5th Army of the Northeast Anti-Japanese Allied Army. The unit fought mostly within the Heilongjiang Province. In March 1937, he commanded troops to fight Yilan City, where they caused more than 300 Japanese casualties. In October 1937, the Fourth, Fifth, Seventh, Eighth, and Tenth armies of the Anti-Japanese Army was reorganized into the 2nd Route Army. Zhou served as the commander-in-chief of the Second Route Army of the Northeast Anti-Japanese United Army and secretary of the CPC Jidong Provincial Party Committee. The main guerrilla bases were located in more than 20 counties on the banks of Songhua and Ussuri Rivers. After the reorganization of the army in 1937, Zhou became the commander of the Third Route Army, which was active in the mountainous areas of eastern Jilin Province.

In 1940, the unit withdrew into the Soviet Union for training, after suffering from massive losses due to Japanese retaliatory attacks. This was in accordance with the discussions between Zhou, Li Zhaolin and Feng Zhongyun with the CPSU Committee of the Far Eastern Territory and the Soviet Far Eastern Army at headquarters in Khabarovsk. During this time, he met and became acquainted with future leader of North Korea Kim Il-sung, who also served in Zhou's unit.

In early August 1941, the teaching brigade of the Northeast Anti-Japanese Allied Forces was established in the Soviet Union, with Zhou serving as the brigade commander. In February 1942, Zhou Baozhong and Zhao Shangzhi returned to the Northeast Second Route Army headquarters from Soviet Union. On August 1, the Northeast Anti-Japanese Army was reorganized into the 88th Separate Rifle Brigade of the Soviet Red Army’s Far Eastern Front, and Zhou was appointed as its commander.

In August 1945, following the Soviet invasion of Manchuria, Zhou led his troops in cooperating with the Red Army's march into the Northeast China. As a result, the troops were transferred from the Northeast to the Eighth Route Army and the New Fourth Army. On August 11, Zhou summoned troops to board the ship according to a predetermined plan and arrived in Heilongjiang to return home.

Chinese Civil War

Zhou returned to Changchun in September 1945, under the alias Huang Shaoyuan. He served as the deputy commander of the Soviet garrison headquarters in Changchun. In September of the same year, the Northeast Anti-Japanese Army was renamed the Northeast People's Self-Defense Force, and Zhou was appointed as its general commander. On October 31, the former Northeast Anti-Japanese Army and indigenous armed groups were combined to form the Northeastern People's Autonomous Army. Zhou was appointed deputy chief of staff under the command of Lin Biao.

He also served as secretary of the Jihe District Party Committee, commander and political commissar of the Jihe National Army, and chairman of the Jihe Administrative Committee in Hubei. In November, the Jilin Provincial Working Committee and Jilin Military Region were established. Zhou served as a member of the Provincial Working Committee and commander of the Jilin Military Region.

In January 1946, the Northeast People’s Autonomous Army was renamed as Northeast Democratic Alliance Army, and Zhou served as the deputy commander-in-chief of the Northeast Democratic Alliance Army and commander of the Jilin Military Region. On April 14, 1946, part of the main force of the Northeast Democratic Alliance Army, together with the Jilin Military Region, was divided into three columns under the command of Zhou to attack the Kuomintang units in Changchun. The battle led to the destruction of Kuomintang's Northeast Security Corps fourth and fifth units, leading to a major Chinese Communist military victory in the Northeast in October 1948. However, after the Democratic Alliance Army was renamed the Northeastern People's Liberation Army in January 1948, it was reorganized into the Fourth Field Army in November 1948 and on the same month, Zhou was dismissed as a deputy commander.

In September 1949, Zhou Baozhong served as commander-in-chief and political commissar of the Northeast People’s Self-Defense Army, deputy commander-in-chief of the Northeast Democratic Alliance Army and commander of the Dongman Military Region, chairman of the Jilin Provincial Government, deputy commander of the Northeast Military Region of the Chinese People’s Liberation Army and commander of the Jilin Military Region. He also served as the Northeast Member of the Standing Committee of the Administrative Committee.

During the Chinese Civil War, Zhou led his troops to fought more than 800 battles against the Kuomintang and caused more than 40,000 casualties among the enemy troops. In October 1948, his unit played an important role in the second occupation of Changchun. On September 8, 1949, Zhou Baozhong went to Beijing. On September 21, he attended the Chinese People's Political Consultative Conference and participated in the founding ceremony of the People's Republic of China. When he was about to go to Yunnan to take up his political post, he was admitted to a hospital in Beijing due to a heart attack. At hospital, he was visited by Liu Shaoqi and Premier of China Zhou Enlai who urged him to recover well and not rush to take office. In November 1949, Zhou went to Yunnan.

Political career

After the founding of People's Republic of China, Zhou was made Vice Governor of Yunnan province in 1949. He also served as the vice chairman of the Kunming Military Management Committee and political committee director of the Committee of Political and Civil Affairs.

From October 1951 to May 1957, he concurrently served as the president of Yunnan University and as dean of the Southwest University of Political Science and Law from August 1953 to October 1954.

In 1954, due to severe heart failure and the recurrence of gallstones, the Central Government decided that Zhou would be recuperating in Beijing from August 1954. Prior to this, Zhou Enlai visited him in at the hospital in May 1954 and told him to recover from his illness with peace of mind. He advised him to write and sort out the historical materials of the Northeast Anti-Japanese United Army after recovery. Beginning in the second half of 1954, Zhou organized and wrote the history of the Northeast Anti-Japanese Allied Forces. During this time, North Korean leader Kim Il-sung met Zhou at the Summer Palace.

In April 1956, he was elected as a representative of the Second National People's Congress and a member of the State Ethnic Affairs Commission. In September, he was elected as an alternate member of the Central Committee at the Eighth National Congress. In April 1959, he was again elected as a representative of the Second National People's Congress and a member of the National Ethnic Affairs Commission.

At the beginning of 1964, Zhou was so seriously ill that he was bedridden. On April 21, 1964, he suffered another heart attack and a doctor was sent to provide him with medical assistance. Zhou died on next day in a hospital in Beijing, at the age of 62. Following his death, North Korean leader Kim Il-sung immediately sent a telegram of condolences and assigned the staff of the North Korean Embassy in China to attend Zhou's funeral services.

Personal life

Zhou was married to Wang Yizhi on October 6, 1939, at the temporary station of the Second Route Army headquarters. They had a daughter named Zhou Wei, who was born in the Soviet Union on 1942. Wang died on November 26, 1987.

Zhou Wei was admitted to the Second Military Medical University of the People's Liberation Army in 1962, and worked in the 301 Hospital of the Beijing Military Region in 1973. She successively worked in anesthesiology and hyperbaric oxygen medicine until her retirement. Due to the close relationship between her father and Kim Il-sung, she often visits North Korea to nurture relations between China and North Korea. An investigation by the Wall Street Journal revealed that businesses connected to the Zhou's family helped enrich North Korea with its national income that contributed to its weapons development. Business records, official media reports and interviews connect Zhou's family with North Korean industries including mining, trade and consumer goods. A member of the family denied that they do business in North Korea.

Awards and decorations
:
 Order of August the First (1st Class Medal) (1955)
 Order of Independence and Freedom (1st Class Medal) (1955)
 Order of Liberation (1st Class Medal) (1955)
:
 Order of the Red Banner (1945)
 Medal "For the Victory over Japan" (1945)

Other honors
The Zhou Baozhong Memorial Hall was built in his hometown of Wanqiao village in Dali City, Yunnan. A tall statue of Zhou was built in front of the museum.

In popular culture
In the 2015 Chinese TV series Northeast Anti-Japanese United Army, he was played by actor Guanghui Shi.

Gallery

See also
 88th Separate Rifle Brigade
 Kim Il-sung
 Yang Jingyu

References

Bibliography

1902 births
1964 deaths
People of the Northern Expedition
Chinese military personnel of World War II
People's Liberation Army generals from Yunnan
People's Republic of China politicians from Yunnan
Political office-holders in Yunnan
People from Dali
Chinese Communist Party politicians from Yunnan
Academic staff of Yunnan University
Presidents of Yunnan University
Educators from Yunnan
Vice-governors of Yunnan
Bai people
Communist University of the Toilers of the East alumni
International Lenin School alumni
Delegates to the 1st National People's Congress
Delegates to the 2nd National People's Congress
Members of the 3rd Chinese People's Political Consultative Conference
Members of the 2nd Chinese People's Political Consultative Conference
Members of the 1st Chinese People's Political Consultative Conference
Delegates to the National People's Congress from Yunnan
Alternate members of the 8th Central Committee of the Chinese Communist Party
Recipients of the Order of the Red Banner
Chinese expatriates in the Soviet Union
People of 88th Separate Rifle Brigade